Wheeler was a company town in Mendocino County, California. Sinkyone Wilderness State Park acquired the Lost Coast property after 1975. No structures remain at the location, now used as a campground.

References

Unincorporated communities in Mendocino County, California
Unincorporated communities in California
Company towns in California
Populated places established in 1948
Populated coastal places in California